VULTURE is a fictional international crime cartel in the DC Comics universe. VULTURE first appears in House of Mystery #160 (July 1966), and was created by Jack Miller and Joe Certa.

Fictional team history
VULTURE first appeared in House of Mystery #160 (July 1966), created by Jack Miller and Joe Certa. The organization known as VULTURE was a vast international crime cartel that was infiltrated, thwarted and eventually completely destroyed by J'onn J'onzz, the Martian Manhunter. Their secretive leader had a number of aliases: Mister Vulture, Mister V, and Faceless, but was in reality Marco Xavier.

Shortly after retiring his John Jones persona, J'onzz comes into conflict with cartel operatives when he travels to the French Riviera. While in the Riviera he investigates Marco Xavier, an international playboy with supposed links to organized crime. He uses his shape-shifting powers to follow Xavier as he leaves his villa in a high powered sports car. However, Xavier loses control of his vehicle and it plunges off a mountain road, and is apparently killed, his body quickly consumed by the blazing crash. J'onn takes advantage of this accident by quickly transforming himself into a Xavier lookalike, and lowers himself from the branch of a cliffside tree before the police arrive. The disguised "Marco Xavier" is taken to his villa to recover.

Slowly but surely and using his disguise as Marco Xavier, the Martian Manhunter works his way up through the cartel. While maintaining the original Marco's role as an outside contractor uninterested in joining Vulture, he is eventually able to smash the group from the inside.

J'onn took over the Xavier identity in order to infiltrate VULTURE and they became his main adversaries for the fourteen issues spanning House of Mystery #160-173 (March–April 1968), the final installment in the Martian's original solo feature. Finally, VULTURE maneuvered the Martian Manhunter as Marco Xavier into committing a crime which saw the false playboy hunted as a criminal across Europe. "Xavier" was conveniently rescued by VULTURE and brought before Faceless, who asserted that he knew about the Martian Manhunter's double identity the entire time.

Faceless unmasked to reveal himself as the true Marco Xavier, claiming to have allowed the masquerade to continue in order to lure the Manhunter into the perfect trap (the only explanation for how he survived the car crash was that he 'planned in advance'). Xavier had determined that the Martian Manhunter was vulnerable to fire, and used it to tame the hero before attempting to finish him off with an experimental handgun. Instead, the weapon malfunctioned, seemingly evaporating Xavier, and leaving the Martian Manhunter to sift through the rubble.

To date, Faceless and VULTURE have yet to resurface. Yet, their disappearance left a trail of unanswered questions, including whether the original Marco Xavier was in fact the ultimate Faceless, or if perhaps the organization had simply covered its tracks once again.

VULTURE appears to be experts of molecular mutation. The American branch's invention has the ability to temporarily transform ordinary men into indestructible giants (House of Mystery #166). An underground branch created beams that can change people into purple-skinned were-creatures (that can breathe fire) and back again (House of Mystery #169) that are used for crime sprees.

Membership
 Marco Xavier - Secretly "Faceless", the leader of VULTURE.
 Marco Xavier - The Martian Manhunter in disguise.
 Abba Sulkar - A member of VULTURE that use a device that transferred the entirety of Martian Manhunter (in his Marco Xavier guise)'s mind onto a reel-to-reel tape, leaving him a vegetable. When facing the Martian Manhunter, in combat, he is killed when his weapon backfires. This fate foreshadows his leader's possible death (House of Mystery #161).
 Marie Foucher - A double agent for the French Secret Service that returned Martian Manhunter's mind back into him (House of Mystery #161).

Other characters named Vulture
There have been five characters named Vulture who have appeared in the DC Universe:
 Vulture: fought Doll Man in Doll Man #1 (1941)
 Vulture: fought Spy Smasher in Whiz Comics #48 (1943)
 Vulture: fought Phantom Lady in Phantom Lady #15 (1947)
 Vulture: a member of the Terrible Trio, a team of Batman foes
 In the short story "Vulture : A Tale of the Penguin", by Steve Rasnic Tem, Oswald Chesterfield Cobblepot (a.k.a. the Penguin) has an epiphany. After a bout with depression, he loses a lot of weight and becomes a vigilante with a bit of bloodthirstiness, calling himself the Vulture (1992).

References

External links
 DCU Guide entry on Vulture I
 DCU Guide entry on Vulture II
 DCU Guide entry on VULTURE
 CBR review of House of Mystery #160

DC Comics supervillain teams
Comics characters introduced in 1966